Propebela terpeniensis is a species of sea snail, a marine gastropod mollusk in the family Mangeliidae.

Description
The length of the shell varies between 8 mm and 10.5 mm.

Distribution
This species occurs in the Okhotsk Sea.

References

 Bogdanov, IP. "7 New Species of Subfamily Oenopotinae from the Okhotsk Sea." Zoologichesky Zhurnal 68.11 (1989): 147–152.
 Hasegawa K. (2009) Upper bathyal gastropods of the Pacific coast of northern Honshu, Japan, chiefly collected by R/V Wakataka-maru. In: T. Fujita (ed.), Deep-sea fauna and pollutants off Pacific coast of northern Japan. National Museum of Nature and Science Monographs 39: 225-383

External links
 

terpeniensis
Gastropods described in 1989